2017 Basketbol Süper Ligi (BSL) Playoffs was the final phase of the 2016–17 Basketbol Süper Ligi season. The playoffs started on 23 May 2017. Fenerbahçe were the defending champions.

The eight highest placed teams of the regular season qualified for the playoffs. In the quarter-finals a best-of-three was played, in the semi-finals a best-of-five and in the finals a best-of-seven playoff format was used.

Fenerbahçe competed against Beşiktaş Sompo Japan in the finals, won the series 4-0 and got their 8th championship.

Bracket

Quarterfinals

Fenerbahçe vs. Tofaş

Beşiktaş Sompo Japan vs. Gaziantep Basketbol

Anadolu Efes vs. Galatasaray Odeabank

Darüşşafaka Doğuş vs. Banvit

Semifinals

Fenerbahçe vs. Darüşşafaka Doğuş

Beşiktaş Sompo Japan vs. Anadolu Efes

Finals

Fenerbahçe vs. Beşiktaş Sompo Japan

References
BSL.org.tr
TBF.org.tr

Playoff
Turkish Basketball Super League Playoffs